The 2017–18 Maine Black Bears men's ice hockey season, the team represented the University of Maine during the 2017–18 NCAA Division I men's ice hockey season. The team was coached by Red Gendron, in his 5th season with the Black Bears. The Black Bears played their home games at Alfond Arena on campus in Orono, Maine, competing in Hockey East.

Personnel

Roster

As of March 10, 2018.

Standings

Schedule

|-
!colspan=12 style=""| Exhibition

|-
!colspan=12 style=""| Regular Season

|-
!colspan=12 style=""| Hockey East Tournament

Rankings

References

Maine Black Bears men's ice hockey seasons
Maine Black Bears
Maine Black Bears
2017 in sports in Maine
2018 in sports in Maine